Hamade is an heraldic ordinary in the shape of three bars placed one under another, not touching the edges of the field. The bars can be of equal length or have the top bar longer than the bottom one. They can have straight edges, or skewed edges, with their base being shorter than their top.

Etymology 
The name derives from French word haméïde, and comes from the name of the village of Lahamaide, Belgium, which used the ordinary in its coat of arms.

Examples

Citations

Notes

References

Bibliography 
 J.P. Brooke-Little, (1996). A Heraldic Alphabet. Robson Books.
 Gert Oswald, Lexikon der Heraldik. VEB Bibliographisches Institut, Leipzig 1984. ISBN 3-411-02149-7.
 L.-A. Duhoux d'Argicourt, l'Alphabet et figures de tous les termes du blason, Paris 1899.

Heraldic ordinaries